Karl John (24 March 1905 – 22 December 1977) was a German film actor who appeared in more than 50 films between 1933 and 1977.

Early life
John was born in Cologne, Germany. He studied architecture at the Technische Hochschule in Danzig. But he soon discovered his love for the stage and moved to Berlin where he took acting lessons.

Career
At 26 he made his debut performance at a theater in Boleslawiec. John made his first film appearance in the 1932 thriller The White Demon which also starred Hans Albers in the lead role. Throughout the 1930s he played numerous roles at various theaters throughout Nazi Germany. In 1938, John came to the prestigious Deutsches Theater in Berlin.

At the outbreak of World War II John appeared in many German propaganda films made by the Reichs Ministry of Public Enlightenment and Propaganda under the auspices of Reich Minister Joseph Goebbels. He played soldiers and sailors, he also voiced information films on the role of dive bombers, tanks and submarines. However, in 1943 he was sentenced to death by the People's Court for espousing "defeatist views" after Goebbels became aware he had been making "jokes about Hitler". His sentence was commuted to service in Wehrmacht.

After World War II, John played several roles in various anti-war German film. In 1947 he starred in In Those Days and Love 47, an adaption of Wolfgang Borchert's play The Man Outside. John also played a Gestapo agent in Peter Lorre's only directorial outing, the German-language Der Verlorene in 1951.

Throughout the 1950s John often portrayed members of the Wehrmacht such as in Des Teufels General (1955), Hunde, wollt ihr ewig leben (1957) and Fabrik der Offiziere (1960). In 1962 John played a German general in Darryl F. Zanuck's international 1962 war epic The Longest Day.

In the 1960s, he appeared in several stage productions based on adaptation of the works of British writer and journalist, Edgar Wallace. In the 1970s John also made guest appearances on West German television crime shows including Derrick, Tatort and Der Kommissar.

Throughout his career John continued to do voice over work. In 1959 he became the voice of Paul Temple in an eight-part radio play based on the works of Francis Durbridge. The series was directed by future award winner Willy Purucker.

Death
On 20 December 1977, the 72-year-old John collapsed shortly before a performance of "Moon Over the River" by Pavel Kohout at the Theater Gütersloh in Gütersloh.  He died two days later at the city hospital from cardiovascular disease. He was buried at Friedhof Heerstraße in Berlin.

Selected filmography

 The White Demon (1932)
 When the Cock Crows (1936) - Piepers Gustav
  (1937) - Graf Kostja Wolfgoff
 Unternehmen Michael (1937) - Leutnant Hassenkamp
 Der Lachdoktor (1937) - Peter Karst, Lehrer
 Legion Condor (1939)
 Bal paré (1940) - Erstchargierter Franz Stanglmayer
 Die unvollkommene Liebe (1940) - Kristas Brudr Gustl
 Kora Terry (1940) - Chef der Kraftmännertruppe
 Fahrt ins Leben (1940) - Seekadett Gerhard Bartels
 My Life for Ireland (1941) - Raymond Davitt
 Above All Else in the World (1941) - Olt. Hassencamp
 Der Weg ins Freie (1941) - Fritz
 U-Boote westwärts! (1941) - Matrosenobergefreiter Drewitz
 Stukas (1941) - Oberleutnant Lothar Loos
 Two in a Big City (1942) - Bernd Birckhoff
 Andreas Schlüter (1942) - Martin Böhme
 Melody of a Great City (1943) - Klaus Nolte
 In Those Days (1947) - Peter Keyser / 1. Geschichte
 Unser Mittwochabend (1948) - Erik
 The Last Night (1949) - Harald Buchner, Oberleutnant
 Love '47 (1949) - Beckmann
 The Lost One (1951) - Hösch, alias Nowak
 The Smugglers' Banquet (1952) - Hans
 The Man Between (1953) - Inspector Kleiber
 No Way Back (1953) - Friedrich Schultz
 Des Teufels General (1955) - Ingenieur Karl Oderbruch
 Hotel Adlon (1955) - Herr von Malbrand
 Urlaub auf Ehrenwort (1955) - Köhler
 Stalingrad: Dogs, Do You Want to Live Forever? (1959) - Generaloberst Hoth
 Two Times Adam, One Time Eve (1959) - Wickström
 Sacred Waters (1960) - Seppi Blatter, Romans Vater
  (1960) - Major Frey
  (1961) - Debras 
 The Longest Day (1962) - Gen. Wolfgang Häger
 Der Hexer (1964) - Shelby
 Neues vom Hexer (1965) - Dr. Mills
  (1968, TV miniseries) - Hohmann
 Sabine (1974) - Dr. Gerd Hesse
 Pusteblume (1974) - Ricks Vater
 Derrick (1976, Season 3, Episode 8: "Auf eigene Faust") - Euler
 Sorcerer (1977) - 'Marquez'

Notes
Citations

Sources
 Kay Weniger: Das große Personenlexikon des Films. Die Schauspieler, Regisseure, Kameraleute, Produzenten, Komponisten, Drehbuchautoren, Filmarchitekten, Ausstatter, Kostümbildner, Cutter, Tontechniker, Maskenbildner und Special Effects Designer des 20. Jahrhunderts. Band 4: H – L. Botho Höfer – Richard Lester.'' Schwarzkopf & Schwarzkopf, Berlin 2001, ISBN 3-89602-340-3, p. 230

External links

1905 births
1977 deaths
German male film actors
German male television actors
20th-century German male actors